Beryl Junction is a census-designated place (CDP) in Iron County, Utah, United States. The population was 197 at the 2010 census. Beryl Junction Airport, a small, private airport, is located here.

Geography
Beryl Junction sits on the southern edge of the Escalante Desert. Most of it lies to the southeast of the junction itself.

History
In 1909, the New Castle Reclamation Company invested in land near the Beryl Crossroads in the Escalante Valley. The company built a hotel to bring prospective buyers, promoting the land for agricultural development. The venture failed around 1915, but the community has grown slowly since then as modern irrigation techniques have made the farmland productive.

Demographics
As of the census of 2010, there were 197 people, 55 households, and 38 families residing in the CDP. There were 70 housing units, of which 99 were occupied. The racial makeup of the population was 54.3% White, 3.6% American Indian and Alaska Native, 38.1% from some other race, and 4.1% from two or more races. Hispanic or Latino of any race were 51.8% of the population.

Out of the 55 households, 52.7% had children under the age of 18 living with them. 49.1% had married couples living together. 14.5% of all households were made up of individuals, and 7.3% had someone living alone who was 65 years of age or older. The average household size was 3.58, and the average family size was 4.21.

The population was 53.8% male, and the median age was 23.5 years.

Education
Elementary students attend Escalante Valley Elementary School, located right at the junction. Older students go to school in Cedar City.

See also

 List of census-designated places in Utah

References

External links

Census-designated places in Utah
Census-designated places in Iron County, Utah
Transportation in Iron County, Utah